The Professional Disc Golf Association (PDGA) is a 501(c)(4) nonprofit membership organization dedicated to the promotion and sustainable growth of 
disc golf. The PDGA is the global governing body of disc golf.  The organization promotes the sport through tournament development, course development, rules and competitive standards, media and sponsor relations, and public education and outreach.

As of September 1, 2022, the current PDGA Board of Directors consists of PDGA President Nate Heinold, Vice President Wilbur Wallis, Treasurer David Schreff, and Secretary Geoff Hungerford, as well as Laura Nagtegaal, Leah Tsinajinnie, and Conrad Damon.

Organizational structure 

The PDGA is a membership organization with Professional-class and Amateur-class members who pay yearly dues to belong to the organization.

Board of Directors 

Strategic planning and oversight is handled by the Board of Directors, usually comprising seven Board members elected by the active PDGA membership from a pool of self-nominated candidates who must themselves be PDGA members in good standing. Board members serve three-year terms, and elections are staggered such that only two or three members of the Board are elected each year. In 2022, Laura Nagtegaal was re-elected to her second term on the Board and Conrad Damon was elected for the first time since his prior service (1999-2002). In 2021, the members elected Leah Tsinajinnie, David Schreff, and Wilbur Wallis to their first terms on the Board. In 2020, Nate Heinold was re-elected to his second term on the Board, and Geoff Hungerford was appointed to complete the term of Will Schusterick. Heinold and Hungerford's spots on the Board will be up for election in 2023.

The Board votes to elect four officer positions from its seven members: President, Vice President, Treasurer, and Secretary.  The current officers are:  Nate Heinold, President; Wilbur Wallis, Vice President; David Schreff, Treasurer; Geoff Hungerford, Secretary.  The other three Board members are Directors with no specific officer role.  Board decisions require a quorum of four members, and most decisions are made by majority vote.

Staff 

The PDGA also has a professional staff that handles tactical planning and day-to-day operations, led by Executive Director Joe Chargualaf. The staff is split into several directorates which address organizational operations, membership services, quality control and operations at large events, support for tournament directors and events of all sizes, marketing and media, and technological advancements and event administration tools.

Volunteers 

Finally, the PDGA has a dedicated team of volunteers. The State Coordinators, Province Coordinators, and Country Representatives manage the event calendars and serve as a front-line point of contact between the organization and the grassroots local clubs and Event Directors.

Committees 

The PDGA's Committees are primarily volunteer-based, with most having a liaison from the staff and the Board.  The current Committees are:

Legislative Committees
Rules - dealing with all matters related to the Official Rules of Disc Golf
Competition - jurisdiction over the Competition Manual for Disc Golf Events and Tour Standards

Policy Committees
Technical Standards Working Group - ensures all approved equipment meets a standard set of dimensions and safety regulations.
Environmental - examines the challenges and solutions for disc golf's ongoing environmental stewardship and sustainability.
Youth and Education Committee - focuses on expansion of disc golf in schools and in youth sports.
Medical Committee - examines potential harms to player safety and well-being.
Course Design Working Group - explores and creates general, non-binding standards for disc golf courses.
Disciplinary Committee - creates, promulgates, and enforces standards of conduct and disciplinary action.

Constituent-Based Committees
Pro Touring Players Committee - represents the interests of full-time touring professional players.
Women's Committee - advocates for women in the sport.
Military Committee - acts as the voice for the large veteran community in disc golf.
Senior Committee - ensures the needs of disc golfers aged 50 and over are made clear.

PDGA Majors 
Majors are the highest level of disc golf competition.  The current PDGA Majors held annually are: the Professional, Amateur, Masters, and Junior Disc Golf World Championships; the United States national championships (United States Disc Golf Championship, United States Women's Disc Golf Championship, United States Amateur Disc Golf Championship, Tim Selinske United States Masters Championships, and the National Collegiate Disc Golf Championships); the European Open; and the PDGA Champions Cup.  The current FPO World Champion is Kristin Tattar, and the current MPO World Champion is Paul McBeth.

Disc Golf Pro Tour 
The Disc Golf Pro Tour (DGPT) is the Official Pro Tour of the PDGA. The DGPT is a private enterprise which partners with the PDGA (and in which the PDGA has a minority ownership interest). In addition to the 14 main medal play events and the DGPT Match Play Championship, the top touring pros can qualify for the DGPT Tour Championship, a seeded bracket of knockout golf performed at the end of every tour season.  The 2021 DGPT Champions are Missy Gannon (FPO) and Nathan Queen (MPO).

International Disc Golf Center 
The clubhouse is home to the Ed Headrick Memorial Museum, which showcases many historical items from the early days of the sport including the first prototype Disc Pole Hole and flying discs from the Frisbie Pie Company pie pan, to the Frisbee(c), to today's modern high tech golf discs.

The IDGC also features the Disc Golf Hall of Fame. Located in Wildwood Park Columbia County, Georgia on Clarks Hill Lake. It is 22 miles from Augusta, Georgia. This 975 acre park is home to PDGA Headquarters and holds three disc golf courses. 

Courses at the IDGC

The "Steady" Ed Headrick Memorial Course, presented by DGA, features special edition Mach III baskets on rolling terrain along the shores of Clarks Hill Lake. The course was designed by Disc Golf Hall of Famers, Chuck Kennedy and Tom Monroe. Multiple target locations and tee areas make it very adaptable for all levels of play.

The Jim Warner Memorial Course is the newest course at the International Disc Golf Center. It features Discraft Chainstar targets and was designed by Disc Golf Hall of Famer, Jim Kenner, with assistance from Ron Russell and Pad Timmons. 

The WR Jackson Memorial Course is the longest and most challenging course at the IDGC. This course was designed by Disc Golf Hall of Famer, John Houck, and features INNOVA DISCatcher baskets set in a very challenging championship configuration.

References

External links 

 PDGA web site (Information about PDGA sanctioned tournaments, the rules of disc golf, and other important disc golf data)
 DGPT web site (Information about the DGPT, the official pro tour of the PDGA)
 WFDF web site (Information about the International Governing Body for all Disc Sports)

Disc golf governing bodies
Sports governing bodies in the United States
Disc golf